The 2013 European Race Walking Cup was held in Dudince, Slovakia, on 19 May 2013.

Complete results were published. Detailed report were given.  Medal winners were published on the Athletics Weekly website,

Medallists

Results

Men's 20 km

Team (20 km Men)

Men's 50 km

Team (50 km Men)

Men's 10 km (Junior)

Team (10 km Junior Men)

Women's 20 km

Team (20 km Women)

Women's 10 km Junior

Team (10 km Junior Women)

Team (Total)

Participation
The participation of 282 athletes ( men/ women) from 29 countries is reported.

 (1)
 (18)
 (3)
 (10)
 (3)
 (10)
 (16)
 (9)
 (5)
 (14)
 (7)
 (18)
 (10)
 (14)
 (1)
 (3)
 (18)
 (15)
 (7)
 (18)
 (3)
 (18)
 (2)
 (18)
 (5)
 (3)
 (9)
 (18)
 (6)

References

European Race Walking Cup
European Race Walking Cup
International athletics competitions hosted by Slovakia
European Race Walking Cup